Jon Frederick Zogg (born November 19, 1960) is a former American football offensive guard who played one season in the National Football League (NFL) for the Los Angeles Raiders and two for the San Antonio Gunslingers in the United States Football League (USFL).

References

Players of American football from San Jose, California
Los Angeles Raiders players
1960 births
Boise State Broncos football players
San Antonio Gunslingers players
American football offensive linemen
Living people
National Football League replacement players